Pseudalcathoe is a genus of moths in the family Sesiidae.

Species
Pseudalcathoe chatanayi Le Cerf, 1916b
Pseudalcathoe aspetura Meyrick, 1932

References

Sesiidae